The Poncione Pro do Rodùc is a mountain of the Swiss Lepontine Alps, overlooking the lake of Ritom in the canton of Ticino.

References

External links
 Poncione Pro do Rodùc on Hikr

Mountains of the Alps
Mountains of Switzerland
Mountains of Ticino
Lepontine Alps